Philip Hewett (7 September 1799 – 15 December 1879) was an English first-class cricketer who played for Cambridge University in one match in 1820, totalling 2 runs with a highest score of 2.

Hewett was educated at Winchester College and St John's College, Cambridge. After graduating he became a Church of England priest and was rector of Binstead for forty-six years, from 1833 until his death. He is remembered in Holy Cross Church, Binstead, by a stone tablet and a stained-glass window.

References

Bibliography

English cricketers
English cricketers of 1787 to 1825
Cambridge University cricketers
1799 births
1879 deaths
People educated at Winchester College
Alumni of St John's College, Cambridge
19th-century English Anglican priests